Samut Prakan may refer to

 Samut Prakan province
 See Amphoe Mueang Samut Prakan for Mueang Samut Prakan district
 See Samutprakan School for School in Samut Prakan Province